Captain Edward Unwin,  (20 April 1864 – 19 April 1950) was a Royal Navy officer and an English recipient of the Victoria Cross, the highest award for gallantry in the face of the enemy that can be awarded to British and Commonwealth forces.

Early life

Unwin retired in 1909 with the rank of commander. He was recalled to the service on 29 July 1914, shortly before the outbreak of the First World War.

First World War
Initially Unwin served aboard  on the staff of Admiral Sir John Jellicoe but in February 1915 he took command of the torpedo gunboat  which had operated as a despatch vessel for the Commander in Chief, Mediterranean and was now a minesweeper.

In 1915, when planning began for the amphibious landing on the Gallipoli peninsula, Unwin proposed beaching the 4,000 ton collier SS River Clyde on the narrow beach beneath Sedd el Bahr at Cape Helles, known as V Beach, thereby allowing 2,000 troops to be landed together. At the age of 51, Unwin was promoted to acting Captain and given command of the River Clyde for the operation.

The River Clyde beached at 06:22 on 25 April 1915, and the plan called for a steam hopper to form a bridge from the ship to the shore. However, the Dardanelles current swept the hopper away so Unwin, accompanied by Able Seaman William Charles Williams, who had served under him on the Hussar and had been ordered to stay by his side, dove overboard and manhandled two lighters into position, lashing them together to form the bridge. All the while Unwin was under fire from the Turkish defenders. When Williams was mortally wounded, Unwin went to his aid and the lighter he was holding was swept away.

Unwin collapsed from cold and exhaustion, his place being taken by other men. After an hour of rest, he returned to the lighters until he was wounded and collapsed again. Once the attempts to land had ceased, Unwin went out a third time to attempt to recover wounded from the beach; according to one account he retrieved seven men. For his actions, he was awarded the Victoria Cross. The citation read:

In August, when a new landing was to be made by the British IX Corps at Suvla as part of the Battle of Sari Bair, Unwin was given command of the landing boats, known as Beetles. He was the first to report on the landing to the corps commander, Lieutenant General Sir Frederick Stopford, and advised against landing further troops inside Suvla Bay due to the darkness and reefs.

Unwin was back at Suvla as Naval Transport Officer for the evacuation in December – he was aboard the last boat to leave the beach. When a soldier fell overboard, Unwin dived in to rescue him. Observing this act, General Julian Byng, the new IX Corps commander, remarked to Commodore Roger Keyes: "You really must do something about Unwin. You should send him home; we want several little Unwins."

He later achieved the rank of commodore.

Later life

Unwin died on 19 April 1950 and is buried in Grayshott, Surrey. His Victoria Cross has been loaned by his family to the Imperial War Museum, London, where it is on display.

A memorial to Edward Unwin was unveiled in Hythe, Hampshire (close to his birthplace) on 11 May 2015 with details of the action in which he was awarded his VC.

References

External links
www.victoriacross.org.uk – Edward Unwin, VC
Location of grave and VC medal (Surrey)

Military personnel from Hampshire
Royal Navy officers
Burials in Hampshire
British Gallipoli campaign recipients of the Victoria Cross
Companions of the Order of the Bath
Companions of the Order of St Michael and St George
1864 births
1950 deaths
People from New Forest District
Royal Navy recipients of the Victoria Cross
Royal Navy officers of World War I
Royal Navy personnel of the Second Boer War
Chevaliers of the Légion d'honneur
British military personnel of the Benin Expedition of 1897